Diana Lucile Paxson (born February 20, 1943) is an American author, primarily in the fields of Paganism and Heathenism. Her published works include fantasy and historical fiction novels, as well as numerous short stories. More recently she has also published books about Pagan and Heathen religions and practices. She is a founder of the Society for Creative Anachronism, where she is known as Countess Diana Listmaker.

Career 
In addition to her multiple novels and collaborations, she has written over 70 short stories. Her best-known works are the Westria novels, and the later books in the Avalon series, which she first co-wrote with Marion Zimmer Bradley, then—after Bradley's death—took over sole authorship. Paxson's other books include Taking Up the Runes, Essential Asatru, and Trance-Portation. She writes a regular column in the women's spirituality magazine SageWoman.

Paxson has been active in the leadership of a number of organizations. She hosted the first activities of the Society for Creative Anachronism, and was subsequently among that group's founding directors and corporate officers when it incorporated. She was the western regional director of the Science Fiction & Fantasy Writers of America, and is a frequent panelist at science fiction conventions, especially BayCon, where she was the 2007 Fantasy Guest of Honor.

A leader in the Neopagan and Heathen revivals, Paxson is the founder of The Fellowship of the Spiral Path and has served as First Officer of the Covenant of the Goddess. She has been Steerswoman of the Heathen group, The Troth, a member of its board of directors, and currently edits its journal, Idunna. She is a pioneer in the revival of Oracular Seidh, which she has taught and performed at many Neopagan and heathen festivals and retreats.

Personal life
She composes and plays music for the harp. She currently lives at her home, Greyhaven, in Berkeley, California.

Publications

Westria
Lady of Light (1982) 
Lady of Darkness (1983) 
Silverhair the Wanderer (1986) 
The Earthstone (1987) 
The Sea Star (1988) 
The Wind Crystal (1990) 
The Jewel of Fire (1992) 
The Golden Hills of Westria (2006) 
Lady of Light and Lady of Darkness have been republished in the U.S. as a single volume under the name Mistress of the Jewels (1991), and in the UK as Lady of Light, Lady of Darkness (1990)

Wodan's Children
The Wolf and the Raven (1993) 
The Dragons of the Rhine (1995) 
The Lord of Horses (1996)

The Hallowed Isle
The Book of the Sword (1999) 
The Book of the Spear (1999) 
The Book of the Cauldron (1999) 
The Book of the Stone (2000) 
These were also published in two volumes, as The Hallowed Isle: Books I & II (2000) and Books III & IV (2001)

Chronicles of Fionn mac Cumhal
In collaboration with Adrienne Martine-Barnes:
Master of Earth and Water (1993) 
The Shield Between the Worlds (1994) 
Sword of Fire and Shadow (1995)

Avalon series
In collaboration with Marion Zimmer Bradley:
 The Forest House (1994) (uncredited)
 Lady of Avalon (1997) (uncredited)
 Priestess of Avalon (2000)
As sole author:
 Ancestors of Avalon (2004)
 Ravens of Avalon (2007)
 Sword of Avalon (2009)

Other novels
Brisingamen (1984) 
White Mare, Red Stallion (1986) 
The Paradise Tree (1987) 
The White Raven (1988) 
The Serpent's Tooth (1991)

Sword and Sorceress series
Paxson has authored the following stories from the Sword and Sorceress series, an annual anthology of fantasy stories:
 Sword of Yraine
 Shadow Wood
 Equona's Mare
 The Sword Slave

Other short fiction
 "The Song of N'Sardi-El" in Millennial Women (1978)
 "An Appropriate Hell" in War in Hell (1988)—part of the Heroes in Hell series
 "Deor" in The Change: Tales of Downfall and Rebirth (2015)—part of the Emberverse series created by S.M. Stirling

Other books
 Celestial Wisdom for Every Year of Your Life: Discover the Hidden Meaning of Your Age (with Z. Budapest) Weiser Books (2003) , 
 Taking Up the Runes: A Complete Guide to Using Runes in Spells, Rituals, Divination, and Magic Weiser Books (April 20, 2005) , 
 Essential Asatru: Walking the Path of Norse Paganism Citadel (December 1, 2006) , 
 Trance-Portation: Learning to Navigate the Inner World Red Wheel/Weiser Books (November 1, 2008) ,

Citations

General and cited references 
 Vale, V. and John Sulak (2001). "Interview with Diana L. Paxson" in Modern Pagans. San Francisco: Re/Search Publications. .

External links
 Author's Official Site
 Oracular Seidh
 Chronicles of Westria site
 Hrafnar site
 Website for the Avalon series.
 Sagewoman magazine
 
 Interview on Elhaz Ablaze: 2010

1943 births
20th-century American novelists
20th-century American short story writers
20th-century American women writers
21st-century American composers
21st-century American non-fiction writers
21st-century American novelists
21st-century American short story writers
21st-century American women musicians
21st-century American women writers
21st-century women composers
American columnists
American fantasy writers
American harpists
American Wiccans
American women columnists
American women composers
American women non-fiction writers
American women novelists
American women short story writers
Living people
Mills College alumni
Modern pagan writers
Society for Creative Anachronism
Wiccan novelists
Women science fiction and fantasy writers
Writers from Berkeley, California
Writers from Detroit
Writers of modern Arthurian fiction